The Greater Twin Cities Youth Symphonies (GTCYS) is a group of youth orchestras in the Twin Cities in Minnesota. Founded in 1972, GTCYS has served over 16,000 musicians and put on more than 500 concerts. The top orchestra has also traveled on 12 national and international tours. GTCYS currently features 10 orchestras for young musicians any age through high school.

GTCYS is a youth orchestra program based in the Greater Twin Cities metro that draws over 700 students from eastern Minnesota and western Wisconsin. Its artistic director is Mark Russell Smith, who also conducts the top orchestra, Symphony.
History: Founded in 1972.

In 2011, GTCYS and the SPCO formed a strategic partnership to serve the community through music and build classical music audiences.

Orchestras
There are ten school-year orchestras ranging beginning to pre-professional levels. All of the orchestras require an audition to match students with an orchestra that meets their abilities. Auditions are held in the spring prior to the following school-year. Auditions for limited openings in the second semester are open in the winter.

The orchestras, in order of beginning to advanced, are:

Philharmonia East and Philharmonia West.

 This orchestra is split between East and West locations for rehearsals and performances. These orchestras do not have any woodwind, brass, or percussion instruments.

Sinfonia East and Sinfonia West.

 This orchestra includes brass, percussion, and woodwinds. The auditions are more difficult and require harder audition pieces and more scales.

Concertino East and Concertino West.

 This orchestra includes brass, percussion, and woodwinds. The auditions now become more difficult and require harder audition pieces and more scales.

Camerata

 This orchestra includes brass, percussion, and woodwinds. The auditions now become slightly more difficult and require harder audition pieces and more scales.

Concert Orchestra

 This orchestra is the first to regularly play unedited works for orchestra.

Philharmonic

 In this orchestra, students begin to tackle the more difficult works in the professional orchestral repertoire.

Symphony

 GTCYS' flagship orchestra, Symphony has the most advanced set of music and players. Symphony tours internationally biennially.

Concerts have been performed at notable venues in the Twin Cities such as Orchestra Hall, Ted Mann Concert Hall, and the Ordway Center for the Performing Arts. GTCYS orchestras have also performed around the world, in such venues as the Sydney Opera House, and the Krzysztof Penderecki European Centre for Music in Poland. Symphony, the flagship orchestra, traveled to Spain during the summer of 2014 by invitation to the Granada International Festival of Music and Dance. In 2016, Symphony travelled to Argentina with major concerts in Buenos Aires, Rosario, and Santa Fe. In 2018, Symphony travelled to Germany, Poland, and Hungary with major concerts in Wrocław, Kraków, the Krzysztof Penderecki European Centre for Music, and Budapest. The orchestra also had the opportunity to attend a concert by the Berlin Philharmonic, participate in a workshop with Berlin Philharmonic cellist Stephan Koncz while in Germany, and visit Auschwitz.  In June 2022, Symphony traveled to Southern Italy, postponed from June 2020 due to the ongoing COVID-19 pandemic.

References

American youth orchestras
Orchestras based in Minnesota
Youth organizations based in Minnesota
Musical groups established in 1972